The Support Anti-Terrorism by Fostering Effective Technologies Act of 2002, or SAFETY Act, was enacted as Subtitle G of Title VIII of the Homeland Security Act of 2002.

The Act creates an exclusive federal cause of action for claims against the provider of a "qualified anti-terrorism technology" (QATT) where the QATT was deployed to protect against, in response to, or to recover from an act of terrorism. This cause of action provides limits on recovery that might otherwise be present under a state law cause of action. For instance, punitive damages cannot be recovered. The Act also specifies that QATT providers may invoke a "government contractor defense" in a lawsuit alleging product liability for such technologies following a terrorist attack. QATT providers are also required to obtain liability insurance, and the extent of liability under the cause of action is limited to the coverage limit of such required liability insurance.

References

External links
 
 

Acts of the 107th United States Congress
United States Department of Homeland Security
United States federal commerce legislation
United States federal defense and national security legislation
United States federal emergency management legislation
United States national security policy
Product liability
United States tort law